Marguerite de Lubert or Marie-Madeleine de Lubert (17 December 1702, Paris – 20 August 1785, Argentan) was a French woman of letters.

Life 
Marie-Madeleine, sometimes called Marguerite de Lubert, whose life is little known, is the author of wonderful folk tales.
She was the daughter of Louis de Lubert, president of the Third Chamber of the Inquiry of Parliament, amateur musician (violin) and founder on 10 January 1722 of one of the first amateur orchestras in Paris, the Academy of Mellophiletes.

She corresponded with Voltaire, and sent him a play of verses in 1732.

Works 
    Tecserion, 1737 or, in 1743, Sec et noir, ou la Princesse des fleurs et le prince des autruches, conte, avec un Discours préliminaire, qui contient l'apologie des contes de fées ("Dry and Black, or the Flower Princess and the Ostrich Prince")
    La Princesse Camion ("Princess Camion"), 1743 , 
    Le Prince Glacé et la princesse Étincelante ("Prince Frozen and Princess Sparkling"), 1743 
    La Princesse Couleur de rose et le prince Céladon ("Princess Roseate and Prince Celadon"), 1743 
    La Princesse Lionnette et le prince Coquerico ("Princess Lionette and Prince Coquerico"), 1743
    La Princesse Sensible et le prince Typhon ("Princess Sensible and Prince Typhon"), 1743
    La Princesse Coque d'Oeuf et le prince Bonbon ("Princess Eggshell and Prince Bonbon"), 1743
    La Veillée galante, 1747 ("The Galant Gathering"), with a fairy tale inserted: Le Petit Chien Blanc ("The Little White Dog")
    Amadis de Gaules, 4 vol., 1750
    Blancherose, 1751
    Mourat et Turquia, histoire africaine, 1752
    Le Château des lutins de Kernosy, 1753, with two fairy tales inserted: Étoilette ("Starlight") and Peau d'Ourse ("Bearskin"),
    
    La Tyrannie des fées détruite, 1756 (re-edition)
    Histoire secrète du prince Croqu'étron et de la princesse Foirette, v. 1790

Recent collections
  Aurélie Zygel-Basso (ed) Contes Paris: H. Champion ; Genève : Diffusion, Slatkine, 2005 ,

References

External links 

Tecserion at Bibliothèque nationale de France

1702 births
1785 deaths
Collectors of fairy tales